Salome Devidze (born 2 January 1986) is a Georgian tennis player.
 
As a professional, her career-high singles ranking is world No. 254, achieved on 26 April 2004, and in doubles 250, achieved on 10 October 2005. She has won one ITF doubles titles.

Playing for Georgia at the Fed Cup, Devidze has a win–loss record of 18-11. Youngest Davis Cup/Fed Cup match winner (S+D):: Salome Devidze at 13 years old and 270 days.

Now a professional pickleball player, Devidze is currently ranked No.2 in womens singles.

ITF Circuit finals

Singles: 2 (2 runner-ups)

Doubles: 3 (1 title, 2 runner-ups)

References

External links
 
 
 

Living people
1986 births
Female tennis players from Georgia (country)
Sportspeople from Tbilisi